Testosterone Rex: Myths of Sex, Science, and Society is the third book written by Cordelia Fine, published in January 2017 by W.W. Norton & Company. Fine discusses the heavy emphasis our current society has put on biological sex and why this is a motivation for this book. Fine goes on to define what 'Testosterone Rex' is and why the idea should be extinct.

Content 
Testosterone Rex is composed of 3 parts made up of 8 chapters. Each chapter begins with an anecdote related to Fine's life and to the topic of sex and gender.

Part One is titled Past and is composed of 3 chapters: Flies of Fancy, One Hundred Babies, and A New Position on Sex. Part 1 of the book discusses the history of sex and gender and how scientist developed the idea of the gender binary of female and male through the scope of evolution. Fine discusses the idea that humans are naturally male or female  that arose from this evolutionary research and begins to construct her arguments against it by dissecting the research.

Part Two is titled Present which is composed of 4 chapters: Why Can't a Woman Be More Like a Man?, Skydiving Wallflowers, The Hormonal Essence of the T-Rex', and The Myth of the Lehman Sisters. In part two of the book Fine discusses the current science that contributes to the ideas behind sex and gender identities in society. Fine begins with discussions about genetics and hormones, discusses how there are flaws in the use of these metrics to label a person as male or female and the statistics on people who do not fall under either the 'female' or the 'male' label, but have the genetics that make them either sex, according to current science. Fine goes on to talk about the emphasis current society has put on the hormone testosterone and how that emphasis currently relates to males and the behavior males exhibit.

Part Three is titled Future and is one chapter; Vale Rex. In this part Fine goes into more detail about some of the issues that are affecting the forward movement of society because of its ideas around testosterone

Reception 
Annie Murphy Paul's review in The New York Times is generally positive. Paul does believe there is a flaw in the way the book is structured. She states that the book is too 'thoroughly argued' and this makes the book feel too briskly written and difficult to take a breath from the arguments Fine constructs.

Katrina Krammer's review in Chemistry World is positive, Krammer points out that the book is humorous. Which, she says, is a surprise because of the books serious topics and well-formed arguments. The reviewer believes that the book is written in an accessible language 'free of jargon' which makes the book understandable by people without a scientific background.

Mel Rumble of the New Scientist gave a neutral review of the book. Rumble focuses more on the arguments around the experiments Fine talks about and the flaws she discusses in those experiments. Rumble believes that Fine is making a connection between gender/testosterone ideas in science: "Ultimately, Fine leaves us clear that Testosterone Rex's old stories are unjustified. What happens next is 'a question for our values, not science', says Fine, arguing for a world where cultural and gender norms sit with evolution, genetics and hormones to take account of all the influences."

Awards 
 2017 Royal Society Inside Investment Science Book Prize

References 

2017 non-fiction books
W. W. Norton & Company books